The 2012–13 season was AEL Kalloni's second season in the Football League, the second tier of the Greek football league system. They promoted to 2013–14 Super League Greece.

Club

Coaching staff

Kit

|
|
|

Other information

Competitions

Overall

Last updated: 26 May 2013

Football League

Classification

Results summary

Results by round

Matches

Pre-season and friendlies
The preparation started on July 23 to Mytilene. The basic pre-season preparation took place to Karpenisi.

Football League
The fixtures for the 2012–13 season were announced on 24 September.

Cup
The fixtures were announced on 13 October.

Players

Squad statistics

Statistics accurate as of match played 26 May 2013

Transfers

Summer

In

Out

Winter

In

Loaned in

Out

AEL Kalloni F.C. seasons
AEL Kalloni